Tom Drake (born Alfred Sinclair Alderdice, August 5, 1918August 11, 1982) was an American actor. Drake made films starting in 1940 and continuing until the mid-1970s, and also made TV acting appearances.

Early life and career
Drake was born in Brooklyn, New York, and attended Iona Preparatory School and graduated from Mercersburg Academy.

He was excused from serving in World War II due to heart problems. Despite this limitation, he did act in British training films.

Billed as Alfred Alderdice, Drake appeared on Broadway in Run Sheep Run (1938) and Clean Beds (1939).

After appearing in the film The Howards of Virginia (billed as Richard Alden), he got his break after starring in the 1942 Broadway smash Janie, after which he was signed to a contract with Metro-Goldwyn-Mayer.

MGM
[[File:Tom Drake in Meet Me in St Louis trailer.jpg|thumb|left|Drake in Meet Me in St. Louis]]
MGM started Drake in a supporting role in Two Girls and a Sailor (1944). He was third billed in a "B", Maisie Goes to Reno (1944) then had small roles in some "A" pictures, Marriage Is a Private Affair (1944) and Mrs. Parkington (1944).

He was more prominently featured in his role as Judy Garland's leading man in 1944's Meet Me in St. Louis. He played John Truitt, the "boy next door".

MGM promoted him to leading roles with This Man's Navy (1944) co starring Wallace Beery.

MGM gave Drake the star role in  The Green Years (1946), which was a huge hit. It was followed by Courage of Lassie (1946), another big hit, and Faithful in My Fashion (1946), which lost money.

Universal borrowed him to play Deanna Durbin's leading man in I'll Be Yours (1947).

Back at MGM Drake was a support in The Beginning or the End (1947) and Cass Timberlane (1947), and teamed with Beery again in Alias a Gentleman (1948). He did another Lassie film, Hills of Home (1948) and played composer Richard Rodgers in the loosely-based biography Words and Music (1948). Cass Timberlane was popular but the other films all lost money.

Drake was borrowed by Fox to play the romantic lead in Mr. Belvedere Goes to College (1949) then at MGM was in Scene of the Crime (1949) with Van Johnson. He made The Great Rupert (1950) for George Pal.

Later career
Drake began appearing on episodes of TV shows such as The Ford Theatre Hour, Suspense, Lights Out, Tales of Tomorrow, The Unexpected.

He went to Columbia for Never Trust a Gambler (1951) and to Allied Artists for Disc Jockey (1951). He appeared in F.B.I. Girl (1951), and Sangaree (1953).

After television jobs for actors transitioned from live telecasts from New York to shows that were filmed in California, Drake had roles in the CBS series Lassie, NBC's Cimarron City, ABC's 77 Sunset Strip, ABC's The Rebel, CBS’ Perry Mason, ABC's Combat!, ABC's Land of the Giants, Land of the Giants, NBC's ADAM-12, ABC's The Streets of San Francisco and NBC's Banacek.

He continued to appear in features, starring in The Cyclops, Date with Disaster (1957) (a rare lead), and Raintree County (1957). He played the leader of a gang of criminals in Warlock (1959) and was in Money, Women and Guns (1958).  He also had a minor role in the film The Singing Nun (1966), playing Ed Sullivan's producer Mr. Fitzpatrick.

His last acting credit was in 1975, according to his obituary in the Chicago Tribune.

 Personal life 
Tom Drake was married to Isabelle Dunn during the 1940s.

Drake was a Roman Catholic and supported Adlai Stevenson during the 1952 presidential election.

Death
Drake died of lung cancer at Torrance Memorial Hospital in Torrance, California (Los Angeles County) on August 11, 1982. His body is interred at Holy Cross Cemetery in Culver City, California.

Filmography
Features:Our Town (1940) - Best Man at Wedding (uncredited) (film debut)The Mortal Storm (1940) - Student in Second Classroom Scene (uncredited)The Howards of Virginia (1940) - James Howard at 16Northern Pursuit (1943) - Heinzmann (uncredited)Two Girls and a Sailor (1944) - Frank MillerThe White Cliffs of Dover (1944) - Dying American Soldier (uncredited)Maisie Goes to Reno (1944) - Sgt. William (Bill) FullertonMarriage Is a Private Affair (1944) - Bill RiceMrs. Parkington (1944) - Ned TalbotMeet Me in St. Louis (1944) - John TruittThis Man's Navy (1945) - Jess WeaverMain Street After Dark (1945) - Radio Broadcaster (voice, uncredited)The Green Years (1946) - Robert Shannon as a Young ManCourage of Lassie (1946) - Sergeant SmittyFaithful in My Fashion (1946) - Jeff ComptonI'll Be Yours (1947) - George PrescottThe Beginning or the End (1947) - Matt CochranCass Timberlane (1947) - Jamie WargateAlias a Gentleman (1948) - Johnny LorgenHills of Home (1948) - Tammas MiltonWords and Music (1948) - Richard 'Dick' RodgersMr. Belvedere Goes to College (1949) - Bill ChaseScene of the Crime (1949) - Detective 'C.C.' GordonThe Great Rupert (1950) - Peter 'Pete' DingleNever Trust a Gambler (1951) - Police Sgt. Ed DonovanDisc Jockey (1951) - JohnnyFBI Girl (1951) - Carl ChercourtSangaree (1953) - Dr. Roy DarbyBetrayed Women (1955) - Jeff DarrellSudden Danger (1955) - Wallace CurtisThe Cyclops (1957) - Lee BrandDate with Disaster (1957) - Miles HarringtonRaintree County (1957) - Bobby DrakeMoney, Women and Guns (1958) - Jess RyersonWarlock (1959) - Abe McQuownThe Bramble Bush (1960) - Larry McFieThe Sandpiper (1965) - Walter RobinsonHouse of the Black Death (1965) - Paul DesardJohnny Reno (1966) - Joe ConnersThe Singing Nun (1966) - FitzpatrickRed Tomahawk (1967) - Bill KaneDeadly Inheritance (1968) - Phil SuttonWarkill (1968) - Inspector Gerard GrevilleCycle Psycho (1973) - Dick RidelanderThe Spectre of Edgar Allan Poe'' (1974) - Dr. Adam Forrest (final film)

References

External links

 as (Alfred Alderdice)

1918 births
1982 deaths
American male film actors
American male television actors
American male stage actors
People from Brooklyn
Deaths from lung cancer in California
Burials at Holy Cross Cemetery, Culver City
Metro-Goldwyn-Mayer contract players
20th-century American male actors
Male actors from New York City
California Democrats
New York (state) Democrats
American Roman Catholics